The Lawrence Military Asylums were a series of military-style boarding schools envisaged by Sir Henry Lawrence in the Indian subcontinent highlands for the sons and daughters of British soldiers. Two schools were established during Lawrence's lifetime, at Sanawar and Mount Abu, a third followed a year after his death at Lovedale, whilst a fourth was later built in his memory at Ghora Gali.

History
In his book The Magic Mountains, historian Dane Kennedy states;

Further excerpt from The Magic Mountains: Hill Stations and the British Raj

Asylums
Four asylums were established around the Indian subcontinent, namely;

Sanawar (in present-day Himachal Pradesh) in 1847
Mount Abu (in present-day Rajasthan) in 1856
Lovedale near Ootacamund (in present-day Tamil Nadu) in 1858
Ghora Gali (in present-day Punjab, Pakistan) in 1860.

At present, three of the four continue to function as schools, whilst the Mount Abu school was converted to Central Police Training College for the training of IPS officers after independence and after shifting of CPTC to Hyderabad as National Police Academy, the school at Mount Abu was converted to Internal Security Academy under the control of CRPF.

See also

Henry Montgomery Lawrence
Lawrence School, Sanawar
Lawrence School, Lovedale
Lawrence College Ghora Gali

References

External links
 The Magic Mountains: Hill Stations and the British Raj
 The Lawrence Military Asylum: Being a Brief Account of the Past Ten Years of the Existence (1858)

History of education in India